Wakemanites were a cult in New Haven, Connecticut led by Rhoda Wakeman, who identified as a prophetess returned from the dead. The followers killed a farmer who they were told was possessed and the group became extinct. The New York Times interviewed the "convinced parties" in the wake of the murder.

References

New religious movements